Elijah J. L. Haahr (born May 28, 1982) is an American attorney and politician who served as a member of the Missouri House of Representatives, for the 134th district from 2013 to 2021. He is a member of the Republican Party.

Early life and education
Haahr grew up in southwest Missouri. He attended Ozarks Technical Community College and was a member of the National Dean's List and Phi Theta Kappa. After graduating from OTC with honors in 2002, Haahr received an academic scholarship to attend Missouri Western State University. He graduated cum laude from MWSU in 2005. He then attended the University of Missouri School of Law on academic scholarship and graduated with honors in 2008. At MU, he served as editor in chief of the Environmental Law Review and represented MU at the regional level in mock trial and moot court competitions.

Career 
Haahr is an attorney with Kutak Rock and focuses on product liability and personal injury. He is licensed to practice in Missouri and Oklahoma.

During his time in the Missouri House of Representatives, Haahr chaired the Emerging Issues Committee and served as Speaker Pro Tem. In September 2017, he was elected to serve as Speaker of House starting in January 2019. He is the only Speaker in Missouri history from Springfield.

In 2019, Haahr spoke in favor of a criminal justice reform measure to undo mandatory minimum sentencing laws for nonviolent offenders and give judges the discretion to determine sentencing on the basis of the offender's character, rehabilitation prospects and threat to society.

In 2019, he spoke in favor of overturning voter-approved redistricting rules whereby a nonpartisan state demographer, with the 70% approval of a citizen commission, would re-draw legislative districts every year. The rules also included requirements that the districts be drawn to make them competitive. According to an Associated Press analysis, those rules would likely reduce the Republican Party's supermajorities in the Missouri General Assembly.

Electoral history

State Representative

Personal life

Elijah lives in Springfield with his four children. He is a member of the National Rifle Association.

References

External links 

 

|-

1982 births
21st-century American politicians
Living people
Speakers of the Missouri House of Representatives
Republican Party members of the Missouri House of Representatives
Politicians from Springfield, Missouri
University of Missouri alumni